{{Infobox person
| name        = Premil Ratnayake
| native_name = ප්‍රෙමිල් රත්නායක
| image       = File:At the Ministry of Trade.jpg
| birth_name  = Premil Ratnayake
| birth_date  = 
| birth_place = Hatton, Ceylon
| death_date  = 
| death_place = Colombo, Sri Lanka
| nationality = Sri Lankan
| spouse      = 
| children    = 
 Nayomini Ratnayake Weerasooriya
 Sirimali
 Manohari
| alma_mater  = Ananda College, Colombo
| occupation  = 
 Journalist – 
The Lake House
The Island (Newspaper)
The Daily News 
 First Secretary – Ministry of Foreign Affairs 
 Press Secretary – Ministry of Trade & Shipping
| website            = 
}}

Premil Ratnayake, (Sinhala: ප්‍රෙමිල් රත්නායක; 3 April 1933 – 10 April 2013), was a Sri Lankan journalist, author, writer, diplomat, and former First Secretary (Press and Information). Ratnayake was a prominent journalist, having worked at The Lake House, The Daily News, and The Island. He also worked under Lalith Athulathmudali, as Press Secretary, at the Ministry of Trade and Shipping. In 1984 he was assigned to Bonn, Germany, as First Secretary, for Press and Information, on behalf of the Ministry of Foreign Affairs. Later while in retirement, he returned to The Daily News for a short period.

 Early life 
Ratnayake Mudianselage Premil Ratnayake was born on 3 April 1933, in Hatton, Ceylon. He was the fourth son of Mudianselage Marshal Ratnayake and Rossyln Paranavitanage. He had four siblings; Willy, Wimala, Edwin (former Commissioner of Labour) and Lal, former DIG. Ratnayake was an exceptionally talented student, athlete, boxer and cadet at Ananda College.

 Personal life 
Premil married Jasmine Ratnayake in 1964, they had three children; Manohari, Sirimali, and Nayomini Ratnayake Weerasooriya.

 Journalism and writing career 
Initially he started work at the Bank of Ceylon, he later left to pursue his passion, which was writing. He joined Lake House, as a journalist for the Ceylon Daily News. Premil worked alongside the likes of Mervyn de Silva who was the editor of the Lake House, Willie de Alwis, D. B. Dhanapala and Christie Seneviratne. Ratnayake was a skilled writer and could speak Sinhalese, Tamil and Hindi.

Apollo 12 Crew Tour in Sri Lanka
In March 1970, Premil covered the historic event of the arrival of the Apollo 12 mission crew in Ceylon, for the Ceylon Daily News, part of a 20-nation goodwill tour, to celebrate the successful voyage to and back from the moon. The Apollo 12 was the second spaceflight to land men on the moon, it consisted of Charles "Pete" Conrad Jr., Richard F. Gordon Jr., and Alan L. Bean. The crew was welcomed by the then Minister of State, J. R. Jayewardene, US Ambassador Andrew Corry, and the Mayor of Colombo, Vincent Perera.

1977 Parliamentary Elections
Ratnayake was assigned to cover the 1977 Parliamentary elections, this included all the election meetings held by J. R. Jayewardene (at the time the Leader of the Opposition), on behalf of the Ceylon Daily News. They covered almost all parts of the island.

 Government positions 
Later, on invitation from Lalith Athulathmudali, Ratnayake joined the Ministry of Trade and Shipping, as Press Secretary, to handle publicity for the Ministry. The Ministry of Foreign Affairs then sent him to Bonn, Germany, as First Secretary, for Press and Information in 1984.

 Post Retirement 
After retiring, Ratnayake returned to Lake House, to write for The Daily News briefly. Since he was a writer and journalist belonging to the old world order, he didn't fancy writing on computers, and managed to get himself the only typewriter left at the Lake House as he simply says "To hell with the modernity, the scuttling mouse. All this sophisticated hi-fi gadgetry nauseates me and threatens to kill my journalistic creativity. Give me the typewriter any day – I am like an orphan child re-united with his mother. To be true I detest the computer. Only the typewriter can instil in me the desire to write. Its touch the loving caress, inspires me. Maybe I am naive and old-fashioned but I am me and I am in love with the old mistress." Death 
Ratnayake died on 10 April 2013, at the age of 80.

 Bibliography 
Ratnayake wrote several books in his lifetime, four of which were published. One notable example was an autobiography of Lalith Athulathmudali.

 War and Warriors (1996) 
Ratnayake's first novel, was launched in 1996. The story follows Kumar Ranjana, a boy aged 10, and his life ordeals during World War II, following the Easter Sunday Raid, where Japanese forces attacked Ceylon on Easter Sunday.

 The Third Person Note (1997) 
His final novel, The Third Person Note was launched on 12 November 1997, it was held at the National Library Services Board Auditorium, and was attended by Gamini Weerakoon, editor of The Island'', and Dr. A. T. Ariyaratne, president of the Sarvodaya Shramadana Movement.

External links
 Premil Ratnayake Digital Archives

References

1933 births
2013 deaths
People from Colombo
Sri Lankan journalists
Alumni of Ananda College
People from British Ceylon
20th-century journalists
21st-century journalists
Sinhalese writers
Sinhalese journalists
English-language writers from Sri Lanka
Sri Lankan editors
Sri Lankan diplomats
Asian journalists
20th-century Sri Lankan writers
21st-century Sri Lankan writers
non-c
Foreign relations of Sri Lanka
Sri Lankan government officials
Sri Lankan expatriates
Sri Lankan novelists
21st-century Sri Lankan male writers
20th-century Sri Lankan male writers